The Irish League in season 1949–50 comprised 12 teams, and Linfield won the championship after a play-off with Glentoran.

League standings

Results

References
Northern Ireland - List of final tables (RSSSF)

1949–50
League
North
Football